Hillbrush, also known as The Hill Brush Company, is a British manufacturing, cleaning product, and hygiene company. Originally founded in 1922 by Fred and Bill Coward as a family business, Hillbrush focuses on brush development, with other products including squeegees, shovels, buckets, and paddles. Hillbrush is the largest UK-based manufacturer of brushware and hygienic cleaning tools.

History

1900s

Hillbrush was founded in 1922 by Fred and Bill Coward in Mere, Wiltshire, England. The Coward brothers produced wooden-backed brushes, later bringing their respective sons into the business and expanding their services to include plastic-backed brushes for the food and beverage industries. Hillbrush was one of the first companies to create a brush fiber-dressing department, established in 1926. In 1952, Queen Elizabeth II visited Hillbrush's property and the company was granted a Royal Warrant to Her Majesty The Queen in 1981.

2000s
In 2001, Hillbrush purchased Champion Brush Inc. based in Baltimore, Maryland. In 2016, Hillbrush moved to a new facility at Norwood Park, on the outskirts of Mere, Wiltshire, and rebranded its logo. A museum, Visit Hillbrush, opened in 2017 to commemorate the history of brush-making and the company's history. Hillbrush celebrated its 100th birthday in 2022, and its products were among those used in the Platinum Jubilee of Elizabeth II.

References 

Manufacturing companies of England
Companies based in Wiltshire
Mere, Wiltshire
British companies established in 1922
British Royal Warrant holders